The Body is a 2012 Spanish mystery thriller film directed by Oriol Paulo, starring José Coronado, Hugo Silva and Belén Rueda.

The screenplay was penned by Oriol Paulo alongside Lara Sendim. The film was produced by Joaquín Padró, Mar Targarona, Mercedes Gamero and Mikel Lejarza for Rodar y Rodar, Antena 3 Films, TVC and Canal+.

The film received an unofficial Indian remake, the Tamil-Kannada bilingual film Game in 2016. It was also remade in Korean in 2018 as The Vanished. The film had an official Hindi-language Indian remake titled The Body. An English-language remake directed by Isaac Ezban will be released.

Plot
Inspector Jaime Peña investigates an accident that has left night watchman Ángel Torres in a coma. Security footage reveals Ángel fleeing from his job at the morgue before being struck by a car. Peña is informed that the body of a woman, Mayka Villaverde, has disappeared from the morgue. Mayka, a middle-aged, wealthy businesswoman, was married to a younger man and suffered a heart attack following a business trip. Her widower, Álex Ulloa, hears the shocking news while with his young mistress, Carla Miller. Álex assures Carla that Mayka is dead.

At the morgue, Álex tells the coroner about Mayka's medical history. Peña is convinced someone stole the body to avoid an autopsy and is suspicious of Álex, who Peña feels too easily speaks of his wife in the past tense. Peña notes his wife, Ruth, died 10 years ago in a car accident, and he finds he still speaks of her in the present tense.

Álex hears a loud noise and discovers a busted locker. Inside, he finds a small bottle labeled TH–16, and thinks back earlier in the day when he puts drops from the same bottle into Mayka's wine. Peña finds him and informs him that Mayka's cell phone is missing. He finds the bottle on Álex, who admits it is a toxin manufactured by Mayka's pharmaceutical company, but he claims he found it on the floor and doesn't know what it does.

More and more events occur at the morgue that seems to be taunting Álex and Carla, convincing Álex that Mayka is still alive and seeking revenge for his affair and murder plot. Álex discovers Mayka hired a private investigator, as she suspected his affair, and had also heard him plotting to kill her. Álex confesses everything to Peña, first telling him he did love Mayka, having met her by chance in Avalon, California. He also met Carla by chance but fell in love with her, and confided in her his darkest secrets. He said that he thinks Mayka only pretended to drink the wine laced with TH–16, which causes a heart attack after eight hours and leaves no trace in the blood, but that she instead took a tranquilizer that made her appear dead.

The police discover incriminating evidence at Álex and Mayka's house, including a map of the morgue. Ángel wakes up from his coma and reveals that after hearing a noise, he saw Mayka's body in the elevator before a figure in a balaclava fired a gun at him, sending him running into the street. Álex insists Mayka is alive and has the means to disappear and that Carla is in danger. Peña informs him they have no evidence Carla Miller exists and that the address he gave for Carla's apartment has been empty for years.

While transporting Álex, the police discover a body in the woods. Álex fears it's Carla, but it's Mayka. Álex tries to escape and Peña runs after him. Álex collapses and claims he needs an ambulance. Peña tells him about the car accident that killed his wife and that she was murdered, as her life could have been saved if the other driver had called for help instead of fleeing the scene; Peña and his 10-year-old daughter, Eva, watched helplessly as Ruth died an hour later. He then tells Álex that only recently Eva had remembered the logo on a keychain hanging from the other car's rearview mirror: Avalon, California. It was Álex and Mayka who had fled the scene and left Ruth to die.

Peña then shows Álex a photo of his daughter Eva: Carla Miller. It was Peña and Eva who had taken Mayka's body and conspired to frame him. Eva initially wasn't convinced of their guilt until Álex revealed his darkest secrets to her, including the hit-and-run. Álex, now gasping to breathe, learns that eight hours earlier, Eva had dosed him with TH–16, and his death will be explained as a heart attack brought on by stress.

Cast

Critical reception

Roger Moore of Movie Nation gave it 3 out of 4 and called it "A lean, moody and superior horror thriller from Spain."

Remakes 
The film was unofficially remade into a Tamil- Kannada bilingual movie Game in 2016. A Korean remake titled The Vanished was released on March 7, 2018. The film was remade in 2019 in Hindi under the same title by Jeethu Joseph, in his directorial debut in Hindi, with Rishi Kapoor, Emraan Hashmi, and Sobhita Dhulipala in the lead.

See also 
 List of Spanish films of 2012

References

External links 
 

2012 films
2010s mystery thriller films
Spanish mystery thriller films
2010s Spanish-language films
Rodar y Rodar films
Films directed by Oriol Paulo
2010s Spanish films